The 2010 Louisiana Tech Bulldogs football team represented Louisiana Tech University as a member of the Western Athletic Conference (WAC) during the 2010 NCAA Division I FBS football season. Led by first-year head coachSonny Dykes, the Bulldogs played their home games at Joe Aillet Stadium in Ruston, Louisiana. Louisiana Tech finished the season with a record of 5–7 overall and a mark of 4–4 in conference play, placing fifth in the WAC.

Schedule

Coaching staff

Game summaries

Grambling State

Texas A&M

Navy

Southern Miss

Hawai'i

Utah State

Idaho

Boise State

Fresno State

New Mexico State

San Jose State

Nevada

References

Louisiana Tech
Louisiana Tech Bulldogs football seasons
Louisiana Tech Bulldogs football